Drasteria is a genus of moths in the family Erebidae.

Species
The genus includes the following species:

 Drasteria aberrans Staudinger, 1888
 Drasteria adumbrata Behr, 1870
 Drasteria antiqua Staudinger, 1889
 Drasteria austera John, 1921
 Drasteria axuana Püngeler, 1906
 Drasteria biformata H. Edwards, 1878
 Drasteria cailino Lefèbvre, 1827
 Drasteria cashmirensis Hampson, 1894
 Drasteria catocalis Staudinger, 1882
 Drasteria caucasica Kolenati, 1846
 Drasteria chinensis Alphéraky, 1892
 Drasteria coenobita (Kruger, 1939)
 Drasteria convergens Mustelin, 2006
 Drasteria divergens Behr, 1870
 Drasteria edwardsii Behr, 1870
 Drasteria eubapta Hampson, 1926
 Drasteria flexuosa Ménétriés, 1848
 Drasteria fumosa Strecker, 1898
 Drasteria grandirena Haworth, 1809
 Drasteria graphica Hübner, 1818
 Drasteria habibazel Dumont, 1922
 Drasteria hastingsii (Edwards, 1881)
 Drasteria herzi Alphéraky, 1895
 Drasteria howlandii Grote, 1864
 Drasteria hudsonica Grote & Robinson, 1865
 Drasteria hyblaeoides Moore, 1878
 Drasteria indecora John, 1910
 Drasteria inepta H. Edwards, 1881
 Drasteria ingeniculata Morrison, 1875
 Drasteria kabylaria Bang-Haas, 1906
 Drasteria kusnezovi John, 1910
 Drasteria langi Ershov, 1874
 Drasteria maculosa Behr, 1870
 Drasteria mirifica H. Edwards, 1878
 Drasteria mongoliensis Wiltshire, 1969
 Drasteria nephelostola Hampson, 1926
 Drasteria nubicola Behr, 1870
 Drasteria obscurata Staudinger, 1882
 Drasteria occulta H. Edwards, 1881
 Drasteria ochracea Behr, 1870
 Drasteria oranensis Rothschild, 1920
 Drasteria pallescens Grote & Robinson, 1866
 Drasteria pamira John, 1921
 Drasteria parallela Crabo & Mustelin, 2013
 Drasteria perplexa H. Edwards, 1884
 Drasteria petricola Walker, 1858
 Drasteria philippina Austaut, 1880
 Drasteria picta Christoph, 1877
 Drasteria pictoides Poole, 1989
 Drasteria pulchra Barnes & McDunnough, 1918
 Drasteria pulverosa Wiltshire, 1969
 Drasteria rada Boisduval, 1848
 Drasteria sabulosa H. Edwards, 1881
 Drasteria saisani Staudinger, 1882
 Drasteria scolopax Alphéraky, 1892
 Drasteria scrupulosa H. Edwards, 1878
 Drasteria sculpta Püngeler, 1904
 Drasteria sesquilina Staudinger, 1888
 Drasteria sesquistria Eversmann, 1854
 Drasteria sinuosa Staudinger, 1884
 Drasteria stretchii Behr, 1870
 Drasteria tejonica Behr, 1870
 Drasteria tenera Staudinger, 1877
 Drasteria walshi Metlevski, 2009
 Drasteria yerburii Butler, 1892

Former species
 Drasteria albifasciata (Gaede, 1939)
 Drasteria albofasciata (John, 1917)
 Drasteria altivaga (Alphéraky, 1893)
 Drasteria chlorophis Herrich-Schäffer, 1869
 Drasteria judaica Hampson, 1926
 Drasteria nichollae (Hampson, 1926)
 Drasteria pica (Brandt, 1939)
 Drasteria stuebeli is now known as Anydrophila stuebeli Calberla, 1891

References

 , 2013: Five new species and three new subspecies of Erebidae and Noctuidae (Insecta, Lepidoptera) from Northwestern North America, with notes on Chytolita Grote (Erebidae) and Hydraecia Guenée (Noctuidae). Zookeys 264: 85-123. Abstract and full article: .
 , 2013: Additions and corrections to the check list of the Noctuoidea (Insecta: Lepidoptera) of North America north of Mexico. Zookeys 264: 227–236. Abstract and full article: .
 , 2003: Catocalinae & Plusiinae. Noctuidae Europaeae Volume 10: 1–452.
 ;  2010: Annotated check list of the Noctuoidea (Insecta, Lepidoptera) of North America north of Mexico. ZooKeys, 40: 1–239. 
 , 2009, A new species of Drasteria Hübner (Noctuidae, Catocalinae, Melipotini) from Arizona, with comments on the genus. Journal of the Lepidopterists' Society 63 (1): 1-10.
 , 2006: Taxonomy of southern California Erebidae and Noctuidae (Lepidoptera) with descriptions of twenty one new species. Zootaxa 1278: 1-47. Abstract: .
 , 1983: Noctuidae (Lepidoptera) from Mongolia. Noctuidae, Quadrifinae. Annales historico-naturales Musei nationalis hungarici 75: 229–246. Full article: .

External links

 
 Mustelin, T. (2006). Zootaxa 1278: 1-47.
 

 
Melipotini
Noctuoidea genera